Nick Stone (born 31 October 1966) is a British thriller writer.

Background
Stone was born in Cambridge, England, on 31 October 1966. He is of half-Scottish and half-Haitian descent. His father, Norman Stone, was a well-known historian and his mother, Nicole, was a niece of the finance minister in the Haitian government of François Duvalier ("Papa Doc").

Early life
When he was six months old, Stone was sent to Haiti to live with his grandparents, where he stayed until returning to England in 1970. He returned to Haiti during 1973–1974, in 1982 and in 1995. His grandparents owned an estate in Haiti and some of his relatives worked for the country's dictator, Duvalier. During his visit in 1982 he met Jean Bertrand Aristide, the priest who would become Haiti's first democratically elected President; he has said that he had high hopes for Aristide's term as president but that "he turned out to be Papa Doc without the jokes". He has cited his Haitian experience as being an influence on his writings and has said that until his visit in the 1990s he thought it to be an "idyllic" place. From that visit he has said:

He was bullied as a child due to his skin colour. This caused him to take up amateur boxing, at which he fought at welterweight and light-middleweight. His maternal grandfather had been a bareknuckle boxer based in France before World War II. He read History at Jesus College, Cambridge, graduating in 1989.

Work
Stone has named some of his favourite crime writers as being James Ellroy, John Grisham, Elmore Leonard and Carl Hiaasen.

His first novel, Mr Clarinet, took shape during his visit to Haiti of 1995. In an interview with Stone it was said that the book "articulated the change in Haiti over the last 30 years".

Stone's second novel, King of Swords – a prequel to Mr Clarinet, set in Cocaine Cowboy era Miami – was published in 2007.

Stone's third novel, Voodoo Eyes, set in Miami and Cuba either side of the 2008 US Presidential Election, marks the third and final outing for the character of Max Mingus.

Nick Stone's fourth novel, The Verdict, is a legal thriller set in contemporary London.  The book was a significant departure from Stone's previous novels, in both content and narrative style.

Awards
Mr Clarinet won the CWA Ian Fleming Steel Dagger award in 2006 for best thriller of the year, the International Thriller Writers Award for best first novel, and the Macavity Award for best first novel, both in 2007. The French translation, Tonton Clarinette, won the ninth SNCF Prix du Polar in 2009.

References

External links

1966 births
21st-century British novelists
Alumni of Jesus College, Cambridge
Black British writers
British thriller writers
Living people
Macavity Award winners
People from Cambridge
British people of Haitian descent
British people of Scottish descent